This is a list of beaches in Ecuador.

Beaches in Ecuador

 

 Atacames
 Bartolomé (Bartholomew) Island
 Darwin (Culpepper) Island
 Española (Hood) Island
 Fernandina (Narborough) Island
 Floreana (Charles or Santa María) Island
 Genovesa (Tower) Island
 Isabela (Albemarle) Island (Ecuador)
 Los Frailes
 Manta
 Marchena (Bindloe) Island
 Montañita
 Muisne
 Pinta (Abingdon) Island
 Pinzón (Duncan) Island
 Playas
 Puerto López
 Punta Carnero
 Salinas
 San Cristóbal Island, Galapagos
 Santa Cruz (Indefatigable) Island (Galápagos)
 Santa Fé (Barrington) Island
 Santiago (San Salvador, James) Island (Galápagos)
 Silver Island
 Tortuga Bay - Santa Cruz Island, Galápagos Islands
 Wolf (Wenman) Island

See also

 List of beaches

References

Ecuador
Ecuador geography-related lists

Beaches
Beaches